Dyplolabia is a genus of lichenized fungi in the family Graphidaceae.

References

External links
Dyplolabia at Index Fungorum

Lichen genera
Ostropales
Ostropales genera
Taxa named by Abramo Bartolommeo Massalongo